Leho Ram Boro (died 29 May 2021 in Guwahati) was an Indian politician from United People's Party Liberal.

Biography
He was a Member of the Assam Legislative Assembly for Tamulpur, representing the United People's Party Liberal, since 2021. Boro died from COVID-19 aged 63.

References

Assam MLAs 2021–2026
1950s births
2021 deaths
Year of birth uncertain
People from Baksa district
United People's Party Liberal politicians
Deaths from the COVID-19 pandemic in India